Narodne novine is the official gazette (or newspaper of public record) of the Republic of Croatia which publishes laws, regulations, appointments and official decisions and releases them in the public domain. It is published by the eponymous public company.

The Narodne novine started as the Novine Horvatzke, first published on January 6, 1835, by Ljudevit Gaj, who created and printed the paper. The first usage of the term "Narodne novine" was in 1843, but the paper changed several names over the years, usually according to the name of the state that Croatia was part of.

Gaj sold the original publishing company to the government in 1868. The current incarnation of the company was officially founded in 1952. In 2001 the company became a public company.

The Narodne novine as the official gazette of the Republic of Croatia promulgates acts, laws and other rules and regulations of the Croatian Parliament, bylaws of the Croatian Government and also Decrees of the President of the Republic. On publication, legislation begins a brief period (usually 8 days) known as vacatio legis, allowing it to become widely known before taking legal effect.

References

External links
 , incl. a searchable database 

Newspapers published in Croatia
Newspapers published in Yugoslavia
Newspapers established in 1835
Government gazettes
Mass media in Zagreb
Government-owned companies of Croatia
Companies based in Zagreb
1830s establishments in the Austrian Empire
1835 establishments in Croatia
Establishments in the Kingdom of Croatia (Habsburg)